Robert David Mutchell (born 3 January 1974 in Solihull, England) is an English former footballer.

External links

Robert Mutchell at Barnet Fan Club of Norway

1974 births
Living people
English footballers
Oxford United F.C. players
Barnet F.C. players
Stevenage F.C. players
Kettering Town F.C. players
Tamworth F.C. players
Association football defenders
Sportspeople from Solihull
English Football League players